Candela Sol Salinas (born ) is an Argentine female volleyball player. She is part of the Argentina women's national volleyball team.

She participated in the 2017 FIVB Volleyball Girls' U18 World Championship and FIVB Gilrs U20 Championship, and 2018 FIVB Volleyball Women's Nations League
 
At club level she played for Boca Juniors in 2018 y 2019. Ganó la liga argentina de voleibol en este último año con Boca Juniors.

International career 
Candela Sol Salinas left Boca Juniors in 2020 to join Green Warriors Sassuolo, which is a Volleyball team located in Sassuolo Italy. The team currently plays in the Serie A2 Femminile which is the second division of women's volleyball in Italy.

References

External links 
 http://www.volleyball.world/en/vnl/women/teams/arg-argentina/players/candela-sol-salinas?id=64562
 http://www.fivb.org/vis_web/volley/GU182017/GU182017_p2-071.pdf
 http://www.fivb.org/vis_web/volley/GU182017/GU182017_p2-053.pdf

2000 births
Living people
Argentine women's volleyball players